Cestoball is a sport created in Argentina in 1897. During the conference in Buenos Aires and Santa Rosa in 1986, the sport changed the name to Cestoball with the purpose of making the old Argentine sport called 'pelota al cesto' (ball to basket) more dynamic and to bring its rules into closer harmony with korfball and netball.

References

Ball games
Team sports
Games and sports introduced in 1897
Sport in Argentina
Sports originating in Argentina 

According to a previous player, this game ( pelota al cesto) was played in at least 1945 in Buenos Aires.